The Perrier European Pro-Am was a golf tournament on the Challenge Tour that was played annually in Belgium from 1990 to 1997.

Winners

References

External links
Coverage on the Challenge Tour's official site

Former Challenge Tour events
Golf tournaments in Belgium
Pro–am golf tournaments